WMNA (730 MHz) is a commercial AM radio station in Gretna, Virginia, serving Southside Virginia and Northern Pittsylvania County, Virginia. It is owned and operated by 3 Daughters Media.  WMNA has a sports radio format, simulcast with sister station WVGM 1320 AM and 93.3 FM in Lynchburg.  Most programming comes from CBS Sports Radio.  It also broadcasts car races from the Motor Racing Network (MRN) and Performance Racing Network (PRN) 

Programming is also heard on 250-watt FM translator W282CN at 106.3 MHz.

Transmission
By day, WMNA is powered at 1,000 watts.  But because 730 AM is a clear channel frequency reserved for Class A stations XEX Mexico City and CKAC Montreal, WMNA must cut its power at night to only 28 watts to reduce interference.  It uses a directional antenna at all times.  

The station's antenna system uses a two-tower array, concentrating its signal toward the northeast. The transmitter and towers are located southeast of Gretna along Zion Road.

History
The station was originally a daytimer, required to go off the air at sunset. It was owned by the Central Virginia Broadcasting Company. Three years later, it added an FM station, WMNA-FM at 106.3 MHz.

The two stations simulcast for their first decades on the air.  They had a full service, middle of the road (MOR) format of popular adult music, local news and sports.  WMNA-AM-FM were network affiliates of the Mutual Broadcasting System.

References

External links

MNA
Radio stations established in 1956
1956 establishments in Virginia
Classic country radio stations in the United States
Talk radio stations in the United States